Ruslan Romanovich Litvinov (born 18 August 2001) is a Russian football player. He plays as a centre back for FC Spartak Moscow and the Russian national team.

Club career
He made his debut in the Russian Football National League for FC Spartak-2 Moscow on 20 August 2019 in a game against FC Yenisey Krasnoyarsk, he substituted Mikhail Ignatov in the 79th minute.

He made his debut for the main squad of FC Spartak Moscow on 21 October 2020 in a Russian Cup game against FC Yenisey Krasnoyarsk. He made his Russian Premier League debut for Spartak on 5 December 2020 in a game against FC Tambov, he substituted Alex Král in the 3rd added minute.

On 7 February 2022, Litvinov extended his contract with Spartak until May 2026. On 29 May 2022, he won the Russian Cup, playing the full final against Dynamo Moscow, which Spartak won 2-1.

International career
Litvinov was called up to the Russia national football team for the first time in November 2022 for friendly games against Tajikistan and Uzbekistan. He made his debut against Uzbekistan on 20 November 2022.

Honours
Spartak Moscow
Russian Cup: 2021–22

Career statistics

Club

International

References

External links
 
 Profile by Russian Football National League
 
 

2001 births
Footballers from Voronezh
Living people
Russian footballers
Russia youth international footballers
Russia under-21 international footballers
Russia international footballers
Association football midfielders
FC Spartak-2 Moscow players
FC Spartak Moscow players
Russian First League players
Russian Premier League players